The Our Lady of the Immaculate Conception Cathedral  also called Cienfuegos Cathedral is a religious building is located opposite the Martí Park in the city of Cienfuegos in the province of the same name on the Caribbean island nation of Cuba.

The original building was completed in 1833 during the Spanish colonization, but expansions and improvements occurred in 1850, between 1852 and 1861, between 1866 and 1869 and between 1869 and 1875. It became an official cathedral in on February 20, 1903, following the Roman or Latin rite and is the mother of the Diocese of Cienfuegos (Dioecesis Centumfocencis) that was created by Pope Leo XIII by the apostolic brief "Actum praeclare".

The cathedral is part of the Historic Centre of Cienfuegos and, along with other historic buildings in the city center, was designated a World Heritage Site by UNESCO in 2005, because of its outstanding Neoclassical architecture.

Gallery

See also
List of cathedrals in Cuba
Roman Catholicism in Cuba

References

Roman Catholic cathedrals in Cuba
Buildings and structures in Cienfuegos
Roman Catholic churches completed in 1833
19th-century Roman Catholic church buildings in Cuba